Araby is an independent short film directed by Dennis Courtney, starring Van Hughes. It was adapted from the short story "Araby" by James Joyce, which was included in his short works collection Dubliners.

Plot
Based on the short story by Irish author James Joyce, Araby is the bittersweet tale of a young boy's confused affection for his friend's older sister. Taught by Jesuits in turn-of-the-century Dublin, and raised in a strict Catholic family, the boy worships her from afar.  When she finally notices him, the girl expresses her sadness in not being able to attend the enchanting Araby bazaar.  The boy nobly sets out to attain a gift for the girl, but instead meets with a harsh revelation.  The boy's romantic quest through the streets of Dublin becomes a religious pilgrimage, merging the sensual and the sacred.

Film adaptation
The filmmakers makes several adroit additions to Joyce's text, including an episode in the schoolroom where a Christian Brother instructs the boys about the young martyr Tarsicius, whose exploit of carrying the Eucharist to Christian prisoners in Rome is only alluded to in Joyce's text. In fact, Tarsicius is not even named in the story when the narrator records: “I bore my chalice safely through a throng of foes." A second emendation is the expansion of the role of Mrs. Mercer, whom Joyce only mentioned in the story. In the film she confers
with the protagonist's aunt over the tea-table. For this dialogue, missing from the "Araby" text, the filmmakers
went to ‘‘The Sisters,’’ the first story in Dubliners, as well as utilizing narration from "Araby" itself. Another significant change from the story in the handling of the Caroline Norton poem ‘‘The Arab's Farewell to His Steed.’’ Joyce merely alludes to the poem, but in the film, the uncle in voice-over recites lines from it, which indisputably link the verses with the young man as he races down Buckingham Street to the special train at Westland Row Station that will take him to Araby.

Production
The production was completed in 8 days with a cast and crew of 40 people and a budget of $30,000. It was filmed in Richmond, Virginia, Portsmith, Virginia, New Hope, Pennsylvania and Asbury Park, New Jersey. Seamaisin, a group of musicians from University of Notre Dame recorded traditional Irish music for the film and the Dublin-based traditional group Kila also provided two songs for the soundtrack.

Cast and crew
 Executive Producer: Andrew Quicke
 Producer/Director:  Dennis Courtney
 Adaptation: Dennis Courtney & Joseph Bierman
 Director of Photography:  Ron Baldwin
 Production Designer: Charles Currier & William English
 Art Direction: Ammee Copper
 Costumes: Michael Klefeker
 Editing: Dennis Courtney & Joseph Bierman
 Music: Seamaisin & Kila
 Cast: Van Michael Hughes, Joanna Canton, Gillette Elvgren, Mimi Eisman, Mary Christine Danner,
 Narrator: James Turner

Reception
The Irish Edition wrote, "The film subtly reveals the deep feelings that weave their way through the boy's consciousness, from his romantic preoccupation with the girl, the initial hope and anticipation of receipt of the money from his uncle so he can buy a gift and on through to the ultimate failure of his efforts. Joyce would be absolutely delighted with the beauty and magical power of this 21-minute film. “The filmmakers tell the story in a cinematic language that is brisk and impressionistic - like the experiences of a child - but pensive and mature at the same time.”   “The film ultimately helps us to get at what Joyce critic Donald Torchiana calls the "mythic, religious and legendary patterns that Joyce seems to place so frequently at the very center of each story".”

Awards
 1999 Academy of Motion Picture Arts and Sciences - Student Academy Awards - Regional Winner and Finalist
 2000 Producer Guild of America - Santa Clarity Film Festival - Grand Award Drama
 2000 Broadcast Education Association - BEA 2000 - 1st Place Narrative Award
 2000 Saguaro Film Festival - Favorite Short Award
 2000 Angelus Awards - Mole-Richard Award
 2000 Hardacre Film Festival - Best Student Film
 2000 Magnolia Film Festival - Best Short - 2nd Place
 2000 Cine Eagle Award
 2000 Atlantic City Film Festival
 2000 Burbank Intl. Film Festival
 2000 Rochester Intl. Film Festival
 1996 Virginia Museum of Fine Arts Graduate Fellowship Grant

References

External links
 
 
 

1999 short films
1999 films
Irish drama films
Films based on short fiction
American drama short films
Irish short films
English-language Irish films
Films relating to James Joyce
Films set in 1894
Films set in Dublin (city)
1990s English-language films
1990s American films